Trianon Historic District is a national historic district located at Kinston, Lenoir County, North Carolina. It encompasses 33 contributing buildings and 1 contributing site in a predominantly residential section of Kinston.  The buildings include notable examples of Queen Anne, Colonial Revival, and Bungalow / American Craftsman style architecture and date between 1893 and 1930. Notable buildings include the McDaniel-Sutton House (1904), J. C. Raspberry Rental House (c. 1898), Wooten-Black House (1913-1914), George W. Sumrell House (c. 1899), E. T. Turnley House (c. 1925), J. D. Arnold House (c. 1931), and Lizzie Grady House (c. 1912).

It was listed on the National Register of Historic Places in 1989.

References

Houses on the National Register of Historic Places in North Carolina
Historic districts on the National Register of Historic Places in North Carolina
Colonial Revival architecture in North Carolina
Queen Anne architecture in North Carolina
Houses in Lenoir County, North Carolina
National Register of Historic Places in Lenoir County, North Carolina